Espagnole sauce is a basic brown sauce, and is one the mother sauces of classic French cooking. In the early 19th century the chef Antonin Carême included it in his list of the basic sauces of French cooking. In the early 20th century Auguste Escoffier named it as one of the five sauces at the core of France's cuisine.

Etymology

"Espagnole" is the French for "Spanish", and several suggestions have been advanced to explain why a French sauce is nominally Spanish. In Louis Diat's account, Louis XIII's wife, Anne of Austria – who despite her name was Spanish – introduced cooks from Spain to the kitchens of the French court. Her cooks are said to have improved the French brown sauce by adding tomatoes. A similar tale refers to the Spanish cooks employed by Louis XIV's wife, Maria Theresa of Spain. Another suggestion is that in the 17th century, Spanish bacon and ham were introduced as the meat for the stock on which the sauce is based, rather than the traditional beef. In the view of Alan Davidson in The Oxford Companion to Food:

History
The term "sauce espagnole" appears in Vincent La Chapelle's 1733 cookery book Le Cuisinier moderne, but no recipe is given. Antonin Carême printed a detailed recipe in his 1828 book Le Cuisinier parisien. By the middle of the 19th century the sauce was familiar in the English-speaking world: in her Modern Cookery of 1845 Eliza Acton gave two recipes for it, one with added wine and one without. The sauce was included in Auguste Escoffier's 1903 classification of the five mother sauces, on which much French cooking depends.

Ingredients
The recipe given by Carême runs to more than 400 words. He calls for ham, veal and partridges in the cooking pan, gently braised in water for two hours, after which roux is mixed in and the pan is returned to the stove for a further two hours or more. Is it garnished with "a faggot of parsley, chives, bay leaves, thyme, sweet basil and cloves and parings of mushrooms". Carême is credited with codifying the key sauces – the mother sauces, or in his phrase, the grandes sauces – on which classic French haute cuisine is based. His recipes for velouté, béchamel, allemande, as well as espagnole became standard for French chefs of his day.

Nearly a century after Carême, Auguste Escoffier followed the former's classification of the key sauces, though adding mayonnaise and tomato sauces to the list and removing allemande. His recipe for espagnole, dating from 1903, is briefer than his predecessor's. It calls for brown stock (made from veal, beef and bacon),  a brown roux, diced bacon fat, diced carrot, thyme, bay, parsley and butter, simmered for three hours.

Tomato purée is added to the other ingredients in some more recent recipes, including those in Mastering the Art of French Cooking by Simone Beck, Louisette Bertholle and Julia Child and in the catering textbook Practical Cookery by Victor Ceserani and Ronald Kinton.

Derivatives
Sauce espagnole is the basis for many French sauces. They include:

References

Sources

See also
Brown sauce
Demi-glace

External links

 The Cook's Decameron from Project Gutenberg
 Emeril Lagasse's recipe at emerils.com

Brown sauces
French sauces
Mother sauces

de:Spanische Sauce#Spanische Sauce